Astragalus tener is a species of milkvetch known by the common name alkali milkvetch. It is endemic to California, where it grows in both coastal and inland areas such as the Central Valley, especially in moist places.

Description
The inflorescence is a dense cluster of pinkish-purple white-smudged flowers.

Varieties
There are three varieties of this species. One, the coastal dunes milkvetch, Astragalus tener var. titi, is a rare plant treated as an endangered species on the federal level. It is probably now limited to coastal Monterey County, having been extirpated from its previous range in southern California.

An example occurrence of Astragalus tener is within the two extant forests of Monterey Cypress, Cupressus macrocarpa, in Monterey County, California.

References

Further reading
 Jepson Manual. 1993. Astragalus tener, University of California, Berkeley

External links
USDA Plants Profile
Photo gallery

tener
Endemic flora of California
Natural history of Monterey County, California